Danny Hart (born 20 September 1991) is a British downhill mountain biker who currently rides for Cube Factory Racing. He won the 2011 and 2016 UCI Mountain Bike World Championships.

Career
Hart was educated at Rye Hills School in Redcar. He had received financial support from Redcar and Cleveland Young People's Trust as a junior rider. In October 2011, after winning the World Championships, Hart and former Olympic triple-jumper Jonathan Edwards and world paratriathlete Charlotte Ellis helped launch a £31m project to build a leisure centre in Redcar.

Hart won the 2007 youth national championship at Rheola, Wales in conditions he described as 'really terrible'. In 2008, when 16, he began competing the elite class internationally, with a best DH World Cup result of 22nd at Vallnord, Andorra in June. In 2009 he won the Maxxis Cup in Vigo, Spain, and came second in the junior national championship at Innerleithen, Scotland, third at the junior world championship in Canberra, Australia and 20th in the Elite class at the Fort William, Scotland round of the World Cup in June of that year.

Major results

2011
 1st  UCI World Downhill Championships
 4th Overall UCI Downhill World Cup
2nd Fort William
2nd Val di Sole
2012
 7th Overall UCI Downhill World Cup
2nd Fort William
3rd Mont Sainte-Anne
2013
 9th Overall UCI Downhill World Cup
2nd Hafjell
2014
 1st Red Bull Hardline
 8th Overall UCI Downhill World Cup
3rd Fort William
3rd Mont Sainte-Anne
2015
 1st  National Downhill Championships
2016
 1st  UCI World Downhill Championships
 2nd National Downhill Championships
 2nd Overall UCI Downhill World Cup
1st Lenzerheide
1st Mont Sainte-Anne
1st Vallnord
3rd Lourdes
3rd Fort William
2017
 3rd National Downhill Championships
 6th Overall UCI Downhill World Cup
3rd Vallnord
3rd Lenzerheide
3rd Mont Sainte-Anne
2018
 2nd National Downhill Championships
 2nd Overall UCI Downhill World Cup
3rd Val di Sole
3rd Mont Sainte-Anne
2019
 1st  National Downhill Championships
 4th Overall UCI Downhill World Cup
1st Snowshoe
2nd Maribor
2021
 3rd National Downhill Championships

References

External links

1991 births
Living people
Downhill mountain bikers
People from Redcar
Cyclists from Yorkshire
UCI Mountain Bike World Champions (men)
English male cyclists
English mountain bikers